Jakabaring Station is a station of the Palembang LRT Line 1, located in the city of Palembang.

The station is not far from Jakabaring Aquatic Center, Jakabaring Sport City and Gelora Sriwijaya Stadium. The station was one of six stations that opened at the Palembang LRT launch on 1 August 2018.

Station layout

References

Palembang
Railway stations in South Sumatra